Daniel Bennett Smith (born March 6, 1956) is an American diplomat who served as the director of the Foreign Service Institute and acting United States Secretary of State at the presidential transition of Joe Biden. He has held the rank of career ambassador since September 2018. He previously served as Assistant Secretary of State for Intelligence and Research at the United States Department of State, assuming that post on February 14, 2014. He is considered a veteran diplomat by the U.S. diplomatic community.

Early life and education

Smith obtained a Bachelor of Arts degree in history from the University of Colorado Boulder, followed by a Master of Arts and PhD from Stanford University. His dissertation is tiitled "Toward Internationalism: New Deal Foreign Economic Policy, 1933–39", and was completed in 1983.

Career
Under President Barack Obama, Smith served as the United States Ambassador to Greece from 2010 to 2013.

In 2018, Smith was selected to serve as the Director of the Foreign Service Institute.

In 2021, President Joe Biden selected Smith to serve as the acting secretary of state until his nominee for the position, Antony Blinken, was confirmed by the United States Senate. Antony Blinken was confirmed on January 26, 2021. On May 3, 2021, he was appointed as US envoy to India.

References

External links

1956 births
Living people
People from Redwood City, California
Ambassadors of the United States to Greece
Stanford University alumni
University of Colorado alumni
Assistant Secretaries of State for Intelligence and Research
United States Career Ambassadors
Biden administration cabinet members
Acting United States Secretaries of State